Elbe is a municipality in the district of Wolfenbüttel, in Lower Saxony, Germany.

References

Wolfenbüttel (district)